Achaw Singh Laisram was an Indian politician. He was a Member of Parliament, representing Inner Manipur in the Lok Sabha the lower house of India's Parliament.

References

External links
Official biographical sketch in Parliament of India website

Lok Sabha members from Manipur
India MPs 1957–1962
1920 births
Year of death missing